Prince Obus Aggreh (born 30 September 1996 in Sapele) is a Nigerian footballer who currently plays as a forward.

On 16 August 2021, Aggreh joined Saudi Arabian club Al-Kholood.

References

External links
 Prince Obus Aggreh at SportsRation.com
 
 

1996 births
Living people
Nigerian footballers
Nigerian expatriate footballers
Nigeria international footballers
Sportspeople from Delta State
Bendel Insurance F.C. players
Heartland F.C. players
Sunshine Stars F.C. players
Kano Pillars F.C. players
Ifeanyi Ubah F.C. players
Sporting Clube de Macau players
Al-Shabab Club (Manama) players
Al-Muharraq SC players
Al-Kholood Club players
Bahraini Premier League players
Saudi First Division League players
Expatriate footballers in Macau
Expatriate footballers in Bahrain
Expatriate footballers in Saudi Arabia
Nigerian expatriate sportspeople in Bahrain
Nigerian expatriate sportspeople in Saudi Arabia
Association football forwards
Nigeria A' international footballers
2016 African Nations Championship players